The 1934 New York Yankees season was the team's 32nd season.  The team finished with a record of 94–60, finishing 7 games behind the Detroit Tigers. New York was managed by Joe McCarthy. The Yankees played their home games at Yankee Stadium. This was the final year Babe Ruth played as a Yankee.

Regular season 
The 1934 season was Babe Ruth's last season in a Yankee uniform. He was released the following February.

Season standings

Record vs. opponents

Roster

Player stats

Batting

Starters by position 
Note: Pos = Position; G = Games played; AB = At bats; H = Hits; Avg. = Batting average; HR = Home runs; RBI = Runs batted in

Other batters 
Note: G = Games played; AB = At bats; H = Hits; Avg. = Batting average; HR = Home runs; RBI = Runs batted in

Pitching

Starting pitchers 
Note: G = Games pitched; IP = Innings pitched; W = Wins; L = Losses; ERA = Earned run average; SO = Strikeouts

Other pitchers 
Note: G = Games pitched; IP = Innings pitched; W = Wins; L = Losses; ERA = Earned run average; SO = Strikeouts

Relief pitchers 
Note: G = Games pitched; W = Wins; L = Losses; SV = Saves; ERA = Earned run average; SO = Strikeouts

Awards and honors
 Lou Gehrig won the Triple Crown.

Farm system 

LEAGUE CHAMPION: Norfolk

Notes

References 
1934 New York Yankees at Baseball Reference
1934 New York Yankees at Baseball Almanac

New York Yankees seasons
New York Yankees
New York Yankees
1930s in the Bronx